The 2016–17 UEFA Women's Champions League qualifying round was played on 23, 25 and 28 August 2016. A total of 36 teams competed in the qualifying round to decide nine of the 32 places in the knockout phase of the 2016–17 UEFA Women's Champions League.

Draw
The draw was held on 24 June 2016, 13:30 CEST, at the UEFA headquarters in Nyon, Switzerland. The 36 teams were allocated into four seeding positions based on their UEFA club coefficients at the beginning of the season. They were drawn into nine groups of four containing one team from each of the four seeding positions. First, the nine teams which were pre-selected as hosts were drawn from their own designated pot and allocated to their respective group as per their seeding positions. Next, the remaining 27 teams were drawn from their respective pot which were allocated according to their seeding positions.

Based on the decision taken by the UEFA Emergency Panel at its meeting in Paris on 9 June 2016, teams from Serbia (Spartak Subotica) or Bosnia and Herzegovina (SFK 2000) would not be drawn against teams from Kosovo (Hajvalia).

Below are the 36 teams which participated in the qualifying round (with their 2016 UEFA club coefficients, which took into account their performance in European competitions from 2011–12 to 2015–16 plus 33% of their association coefficient from the same time span), with the nine teams which were pre-selected as hosts marked by (H).

Format
In each group, teams played against each other in a round-robin mini-tournament at the pre-selected hosts. The nine group winners advanced to the round of 32 to join the 23 teams which qualified directly.

Tiebreakers
The teams are ranked according to points (3 points for a win, 1 point for a draw, 0 points for a loss). If two or more teams are equal on points on completion of the group matches, the following criteria are applied in the order given to determine the rankings (regulations Articles 14.01 and 14.02):
higher number of points obtained in the group matches played among the teams in question;
superior goal difference from the group matches played among the teams in question;
higher number of goals scored in the group matches played among the teams in question;
if, after having applied criteria 1 to 3, teams still have an equal ranking, criteria 1 to 3 are reapplied exclusively to the matches between the teams in question to determine their final rankings. If this procedure does not lead to a decision, criteria 5 to 9 apply;
superior goal difference in all group matches;
higher number of goals scored in all group matches;
if only two teams have the same number of points, and they are tied according to criteria 1 to 6 after having met in the last round of the group, their rankings are determined by a penalty shoot-out (not used if more than two teams have the same number of points, or if their rankings are not relevant for qualification for the next stage).
lower disciplinary points total based only on yellow and red cards received in all group matches (red card = 3 points, yellow card = 1 point, expulsion for two yellow cards in one match = 3 points);
higher club coefficient.

Groups
All times were CEST (UTC+2).

Group 1

Group 2

Group 3

Group 4

Group 5

Group 6

Group 7

Group 8

Group 9

References

External links
2016–17 UEFA Women's Champions League

1